The Warsaw Hub, previously known as Sienna Towers, is a complex of mixed-use buildings constructed by Belgian real estate developer Ghelamco in Warsaw, Poland. It consists of two 130m buildings and an 86-meter building. Construction started in the first quarter of 2016 and was completed by mid 2020, at a cost of one billion zlotys.

Warsaw Hub Fire 
On 7 June 2019, a fire broke out on floors 27–32 of one of the unfinished towers. 130 firefighters participated in the operation, nobody was injured. The following inspection found no damage to the structure of the building.

See also
 List of tallest buildings in Poland

References

Skyscrapers in Warsaw
Buildings and structures under construction in Poland
Wola